Thomas Cowan may refer to:

Tam Cowan (born 1969), Scottish media personality
Thomas Cowan (South Australian politician) (1839–1890), South Australian politician
Thomas F. Cowan (1927–2010), American politician
Tom Cowan (born 1969), Scottish footballer
Tom Cowan (director) (born 1942), Australian filmmaker
Thomas William Cowan (1840–1926), British beekeeper
Thomas Cowan (broadcaster) (1884–1969), radio announcer
Thomas Cowan (alternative medicine practitioner), a conspirationist and former medical doctor

See also
Cowan (surname)